Rye Park may refer to:

Places

Australia 

 Rye Park, New South Wales, a town in the Southern Tablelands region of New South Wales

United Kingdom 

 Rye Park, Hertfordshire, the name of a borough council ward representing part of Hoddesdon